Cupressus lusitanica, the Mexican cedar or cedar-of-Goa, is a species of cypress native to Mexico and Central America (Guatemala, El Salvador and Honduras). It has also been introduced to Belize, Costa Rica and Nicaragua, growing at  altitude.

The scientific name lusitanica (of Portugal) refers to its very early cultivation there, with plants imported from Mexico to the monastery at Buçaco, near Coimbra in Portugal in about 1634; these trees were already over 130 years old when the species was botanically described by Miller in 1768.

In Mexico, the tree is also known as cedro blanco (white cedar) or teotlate.



Description
Cupressus lusitanica is an evergreen conifer tree with a conic to ovoid-conic crown, growing to 40 m tall. The foliage grows in dense sprays, dark green to somewhat yellow-green in colour. The leaves are scale-like, 2–5 mm long, and produced on rounded (not flattened) shoots. The seed cones are globose to oblong, 10–20 mm long, with four to 10 scales, green at first, maturing brown or grey-brown about 25 months after pollination.

The cones may either open at maturity to release the seeds, or remain closed for several years, only opening after the parent tree is killed in a wildfire, allowing the seeds to colonise the bare ground exposed by the fire. The male cones are 3–4 mm long, and release pollen in late Winter / Early Spring (February–March in the northern hemisphere). In most of its natural environment the rainfall occurs with more quantity in summer.

Varieties
There are two varieties, treated as distinct species by some botanists:
 Cupressus lusitanica var. lusitanica (syn. C. lindleyi) - Mexican cypress - Foliage in three-dimensional sprays, with small shoots in two planes. Occurs in lower rainfall areas. (Least concern species)
 Cupressus lusitanica var. benthamii (syn. C. benthamii) - Bentham's cypress -  Foliage in flattened sprays, with small shoots all in one plane. Occurs in higher rainfall areas. (Near Threatened species)

Cultivation and uses
Fast-growing and drought tolerant, but only slightly frost tolerant, Cupressus lusitanica has been introduced from Mexico's provenances to different parts of the world. It is widely cultivated, both as an ornamental tree and for timber production, in warm, temperate and subtropical regions around the world. Trees have not been selected for cultivation from northern Mexico populations, which have a heavy drought endurance.

Locations
Its cultivation and subsequent naturalisation in parts of southern Asia has caused a degree of confusion with native Cupressus species in that region; plants sold by nurseries under the names of Asian species such as Cupressus torulosa often prove to be this species.
It has been planted widely for commercial production: at high altitudes in Colombia (3300 m), Bolivia, Ethiopia and South Africa, and near sea level throughout New Zealand. In Colombia trees are planted to form windbreak hedges and for preventing soil erosion on slopes. It has been planted by Tanzanian mountain farmers for soil preserving and commercial use  since 1990s.

It has been planted as an ornamental tree near sea level in temperate climates and has done very well in Portugal, Buenos Aires Province in Argentina; Austin, Texas and the British Isles where it can reach a height of 30 m (90 feet).

It is being planted in the Argentine province of San Luis, Argentina at 1500 m above sea level with forestation purposes for creating artificial forests in a land originally lacking of them in a very similar climate to that of its origin site.

See also 
 Cedar wood

References

External links

 Gymnosperm Database: Cupressus lusitanica

lusitanica
Trees of Mexico
Trees of Puebla
Trees of Veracruz
Trees of Central America
Least concern plants
Trees of temperate climates
Plants described in 1768
Garden plants of Central America
Garden plants of North America
Drought-tolerant trees
Ornamental trees
Trees of Guatemala
Taxa named by Philip Miller
Flora of the Central American pine–oak forests